Phosphofructokinase, platelet, also known as PFKP is an enzyme which in humans is encoded by the PFKP gene.

Function 

The PFKP gene encodes the platelet isoform of phosphofructokinase (PFK) (ATP:D-fructose-6-phosphate-1-phosphotransferase, EC 2.7.1.11). PFK catalyzes the irreversible conversion of fructose 6-phosphate to fructose 1,6-bisphosphate and is a key regulatory enzyme in glycolysis. The PFKP gene, which maps to chromosome 10p, is also expressed in fibroblasts. See also the muscle (PFKM) and liver (PFKL) isoforms of phosphofructokinase, which map to chromosomes 12q13 and 21q22, respectively. Full tetrameric phosphofructokinase enzyme expressed in platelets can be composed of subunits P4, P3L, and P2L2.

Interactive pathway map

References

Further reading

External links